The Aurora State College of Technology is a public college in the Philippines.  It is mandated to provide technical and professional training in the sciences, arts, teacher education, agriculture, engineering and technology and short-term vocational courses.  It is also mandated to promote research, advanced studies and academic leadership in its areas of specialization.  Its main campus is located in Baler, Aurora.

Academic programs

Graduate program
Master of Arts in Education
Major in:
 Science Education
 Filipino Language Teaching
 Guidance and Counseling
 Educational Management

Master in Management
Major in:
 Educational Management
 Public Management
 Business Management

Master of Science in Agriculture
Major in:
 Animal Science
 Crop Science

Master of Science in Environmental Management

Certificate in Professional Education

Undergraduate
Bachelor of Science in Civil Engineering
Major in:
 Construction Engineering and Management
Bachelor of Science in Electrical Engineering

Bachelor of Science in Mechanical Engineering

Bachelor of Science in Agriculture Major in:
 Animal Science
 Crop Science
Certificate in Agricultural Science

Bachelor of Science in Fisheries

Bachelor of Science in Forestry
Diploma in Forest Technology

Bachelor of Secondary Education
Major in:
 English
 Filipino
 Science
 Mathematics

Bachelor of Elementary Education

Bachelor of Technology and Livelihood Education
Major in:
 Home Economics
 Information and Communication Technology
Bachelor of Science in Information Technology
With specialization in:
 Application Programming
 Digital Design
Associate in Computer Technology

Bachelor in Industrial Technology
Major in:
Automotive Engineering Technology

 Diploma in Automotive Engineering Technician Course
 Associate in Automotive Engineering Technician Course
 Certificate in Automotive Engineering Technician Course

Electrical Engineering Technology
 Diploma in Electrical Engineering Technician Course
 Associate in Electrical Engineering Technician Course
 Certificate in Electrical Engineering Technician Course

Civil Engineering Technology
 Diploma in Civil Engineering Technician Course
 Associate in Senior Civil Engineering Technician Course
 Certificate in Junior Civil Engineering Technician Course

Food Technology
 Diploma in Food Technology
 Certificate in Food Technology

Bachelor of Science in Hospitality Management

Senior High School Program

Academic Track
 General Academics (GAs)
 Accounting, Business and Management (ABM)
 Science, Technology, Engineering and Mathematics (STEM)
 Humanities and Social Sciences (HUMSS)
TVL Track (Tech-Voc)
 Home Economics
 Bread and Pastry Production
 Food and Beverage Services
 Cookery
 Housekeeping
 Front Office Services
 Tour Guiding / Travel Services
 Information and Communication Technology
 Computer System Servicing
 Computer Programming
 Industrial Arts
 Masonry
 Electrical Installation and Maintenance
 Shielded Metal Arc Welding
 Automotive Servicing

Gallery

References

State universities and colleges in the Philippines
Universities and colleges in Aurora (province)